Mountain Pond may refer to:

 Mountain Pond (Old Forge, New York)
 Mountain Pond (Big Moose, New York)